The 1988 Georgia Tech Yellow Jackets football team represented the Georgia Institute of Technology during the 1988 NCAA Division I-A football season. The Yellow Jackets were led by second-year head coach Bobby Ross, and played their home games at Bobby Dodd Stadium in Atlanta, the first season under that name after it was renamed in honor of the legendary Georgia Tech head coach. The team competed as members of the Atlantic Coast Conference, finishing in last and failing to a win a conference game for the second consecutive season.

Schedule

Sources:

References

Georgia Tech
Georgia Tech Yellow Jackets football seasons
Georgia Tech Yellow Jackets football